The Scarlet Hour  is a 1956 American film noir crime film directed and produced by Michael Curtiz, previously director of such noted films as Casablanca, Yankee Doodle Dandy and White Christmas.

The film stars Carol Ohmart, Tom Tryon and Jody Lawrance. The screenplay was based on the story "The Kiss Off" by Frank Tashlin. The song "Never Let Me Go", written by Jay Livingston and Ray Evans, is performed by Nat King Cole. UCLA has an original 16 mm copy of the film in its Film and Television Archive.

The initial filming began on June 6, 1955.
 
A 35mm studio archive print was screened at the Noir City festival in Seattle in February 2019. It was release on blu-ray in 2022 by Imprint Films.

Plot

E. V. Marshall, known to all as "Marsh," works for wealthy real-estate businessman Ralph Nevins and is having a romantic affair with Ralph's unhappy wife, Paulie. He asks her to get a divorce, but Paulie grew up impoverished and refuses to do without her husband's money.

One night they overhear thieves planning a jewelry robbery of the home of a doctor named Lynbury. They do not go to the police, concerned that Ralph might learn they were together. When she returns home later, however, Paulie is physically assaulted by her angry husband.

Suspicious of her behavior, Ralph tells his secretary Kathy Stevens that he's planning to take his wife on a vacation and permit Marsh to run the company in his absence. Ralph then follows Paulie when she sees Marsh. Now willing to do anything to get away from her husband, Paulie pleads with Marsh to rob the jewels from the thieves as they leave Dr. Lynbury's house.

At the scene of the crime, where Marsh successfully steals the gems from the thieves who have robbed Dr. Lynbury's home, Ralph catches Marsh and Paulie in the act and Paulie shoots him. Gunfire from the thieves makes Marsh believe they were the ones who shot Ralph.

As the police investigate, Kathy discovers that Ralph has secretly made a recording, explaining his suspicions about his wife. Kathy is in love with Marsh, who decides to go to the police and confess. It turns out, meanwhile, that Dr. Lynbury has masterminded the burglary of his own home, looking to collect insurance money after having replaced his wife's jewels with worthless fakes. Police eventually place Lynbury under arrest and Paulie as well, with Marsh's cooperation.

Cast
 Carol Ohmart as Pauline 'Paulie' Nevins
 Tom Tryon as E.V. 'Marsh' Marshal 
 Jody Lawrence as Kathy Stevens
 James Gregory as Ralph Nevins
 Elaine Stritch as Phyllis Rycker
 E. G. Marshall as Lt. Jennings
 Edward Binns as Sgt. Allen
 David Lewis as Dr. Sam Lynbury
 Billy Gray as Tom Rycker
 Jacques Aubuchon as Fat Boy
 Scott Marlowe as Vince
 Johnstone White as Tom Raymond
 James Stone as Dean Franklin (as James F. Stone)
 Maureen Hurley as Mrs. Lynbury 
 James Todd as Inspector Paley
 Nat 'King' Cole as Nightclub Vocalist (singing 'Never Let Me Go')
 Benson Fong as Benson, bartender

Reception
The film received mixed reviews from critics. The Times wrote, "It is a very drab hour and a half, in the company of actors who have not yet established their reputations and are unlikely to achieve them as a result of this movie. The story combines a rather unsavory triangle with a jewel robbery and the director Mr. Curtiz has achieved a certain amount of suspense but little else."

David Bongard of the Herald Express wrote that "Carol Ohmart is the sultry boss's wife. She has an amazing physical resemblance, in some angles, to Barbara Stanwyck. Obviously she's Curtiz's Galatea in the acting field. If the material weren't so childish and over-dramatic, she might have made a bull's-eye with this. She soon might be capable of the stuff of a Stanwyck or a Bette Davis."

Critic Leonard Maltin gave the film a lukewarm review, referring to it as a "sluggish study of marital discord leading to murder."

In an interview with New York magazine, Elaine Stritch referred to it as being her worst film, primarily due to her limited role; she said, "The part was so terrible it looked like I was visiting the set: I had nothing to say. I just kept running into places saying, 'Hi!' The worst.". In People magazine, she was quoted as saying "The first film I did The Scarlet Hour was shown in a Greenwich Village art house as a laughable exercise in how not to make a movie."

David Krauss of High-Def Digest wrote that "The Scarlet Hour travels a well-worn film noir path, but slick direction from Michael Curtiz, spirited performances from a fascinating cast, and a jaw-dropping transfer freshen up this taut tale of infidelity, greed, and murder. Excellent audio and a first-rate commentary track also distinguish Imprint's release of this little-known but surprisingly potent movie. Though a far cry from Double Indemnity and Out of the Past, The Scarlet Hour delivers solid entertainment and makes a great addition to any noir collection."

References

External links

1956 films
1956 crime drama films
American crime drama films
American black-and-white films
Films directed by Michael Curtiz
Film noir
Films scored by Leith Stevens
Paramount Pictures films
Films with screenplays by Frank Tashlin
1950s English-language films
1950s American films